Christopher Tolofua (born 31 December 1993) is a French rugby union player who currently plays for Toulon. His regular playing position is Hooker.

Club career
Tolofua made his debut for Toulouse against Connacht in Hcup. He was called as a cover for Gary Botha and Akvsenti Giorgadze who were ruled out due to injury. He was called up from Toulouse's junior side. He was part of the French national academy.

On 31 August 2016, Tolofua agreed to join English club Saracens in the Aviva Premiership on a two-year contract from the 2017-18 season. On 30 October 2018, Tolofua returns to France to join Top 14 side Toulon on a three-year deal from the 2019-20 season.

International career
Tolofua made his Test debut for France against Argentina (in Cordoba) on 16 June 2012, coming off the bench.

Personal life
Tolofua is a native of Wallis and Futuna.
Tolofua is the older brother of Selevasio Tolofua, who plays with Stade Toulousain as a back row.

References

External links
Toulouse Profile (French)
ESPN Scrum Profile

1993 births
French rugby union players
Stade Toulousain players
Saracens F.C. players
RC Toulonnais players
Rugby union hookers
Living people
Rugby union players from Wallis and Futuna
France international rugby union players
Sportspeople from Fréjus
Expatriate rugby union players in England
French expatriate sportspeople in England
French expatriate rugby union players